Nabil Makni (born 29 September 2001) is a professional footballer who plays as a centre-forward. Born in France, he represents Tunisia national football team internationally.

International career
Makni made his debut for Tunisia national football team on 13 November 2020 in a 2021 Africa Cup of Nations qualification match against Tanzania, as an 93rd-minute substitute for Wahbi Khazri.

Career statistics

International

References

External links
 

Living people
2001 births
Sportspeople from Cannes
Association football forwards
French footballers
Tunisian footballers
French sportspeople of Tunisian descent
Tunisia international footballers
RC Strasbourg Alsace players
A.C. ChievoVerona players
Tunisian expatriate footballers
Expatriate footballers in Italy
Tunisian expatriate sportspeople in Italy
Footballers from Provence-Alpes-Côte d'Azur